Tourist is the third studio album by French producer Ludovic Navarre, released under his stage name St Germain. The album's musical style features a combination of nu jazz and acid jazz, what AllMusic described as "a synthesis of electronics with jazz soloing".

Tourist formed the soundtrack of the 2001 French film Chaos.

Samples
"Rose Rouge"
 Marlena Shaw, excerpts from "Woman of the Ghetto" from Live at Montreux 
 Dave Brubeck, excerpts from "Take Five" as the drum and bass loop
"Sure Thing"
Miles Davis and John Lee Hooker, excerpts from "Harry's Philosophy", from The Hot Spot soundtrack
100% Pure Poison, from the album "Coming Right At You" (1974).
"Montego Bay Spleen"
 Scientist, excerpts from "First Dangerous Match", from Scientist Wins the World Cup and from "Laser Attack", from Scientist Meets the Space Invaders
"So Flute"
Roland Kirk, excerpts from the beginning of the bridge of Roland Kirk's version of "Ain't No Sunshine"

Legacy

As of 2018, Tourist has sold over four million copies worldwide.

Track listing

Personnel
 Ludovic Navarre – producer
 Pascal Ohsé – trumpet
 Claudio de Queiroz – baritone saxophone
 Edouard Labor – saxophones, flute
 Alexandre Destrez – keyboards
 Ernest Ranglin – guitar (on "Montego Bay Spleen")
 Idrissa Diop – talking drum
 Edmundo Carneiro – percussion

Charts

Weekly charts

Year-end charts

Certifications and sales

References

2000 albums
Blue Note Records albums
St. Germain (musician) albums